Port Malcolm is a community in the Canadian province of Nova Scotia, located  in Richmond County.

References

Communities in Richmond County, Nova Scotia
General Service Areas in Nova Scotia